{{Beauty pageant
| photo = 
| date =  August 2, 2015
| venue = Newport Performing Arts Theater, Resorts World Manila, Pasay
| entrants = 30
| placements = 10
| presenters = Ruffa GutierrezRichard GutierrezRaymond Gutierrez
| acts = James ReidMark BautistaRonnie Liang
| broadcaster = PBO, ABS-CBN
| winner = Leren Mae Bautista
| photogenic = Janela Joy Cuaton
| congeniality = Janela Joy Cuaton
| before = 2014| next = 2016
|}}Mutya ng Pilipinas 2015 was the 47th edition of Mutya ng Pilipinas'''. It was held at the Newport Performing Arts Theater, Resorts World Manila, in Pasay, Metro Manila, Philippines on August 2, 2015.

At the end of the event, Eva Psychee Patalinjug crowned Leren Mae Bautista as Mutya ng Pilipinas Asia Pacific International 2015, Glennifer Perido crowned Janela Joy Cuaton as Mutya ng Pilipinas Tourism International 2015, and Patrizia Bosco crowned Nina Robertson as Mutya ng Pilipinas Overseas 2015. Julee Bourgoin was named First Runner-Up, while Brenna Cassandra Gamboa was named Second Runner-Up.

Later that year, Bautista was appointed as Mutya ng Pilipinas Tourism Queen of the Year 2015 and became the representative of the Philippines to the Miss Tourism Queen of the Year International 2015 pageant.

Results

  The contestant Won in an International pageant.
  The contestant was a Runner-up in an International pageant.

Special Awards

Contestants
30 contestants competed for the three titles.

Post-Pageant Notes

 Janela Joy Cuaton placed 1st Runner-Up in Miss Tourism International 2015 with a title of Miss Tourism International Queen of the Year 2015 at the finals held in Ha Long Bay, Vietnam. Leren Mae Bautista on the other hand, won the Miss Tourism Queen of the Year International 2015 title in Kuala Lumpur, Malaysia.

References

External links
 Official Mutya ng Pilipinas website
 Mutya ng Pilipinas 2013 is on!
 Mutya ng Pilipinas on Facebook

2015
Mutya ng Pilipinas
2015 in the Philippines